The redhead (Aythya americana) is a medium-sized diving duck. The scientific name is derived from Greek aithuia, an unidentified seabird mentioned by authors including Hesychius and Aristotle, and Latin americana, of America. Redhead weight ranges from 2.0 to 2.5 lbs (907-1134 g), with males weighing an average of 2.4 lbs (1089 g) and females weighing an average of 2.1 lbs (953 g). It belongs to the genus Aythya, together with 11 other described species. The redhead and the common pochard form a sister group which together is sister to the canvasback.

The redhead goes by many names, including the red-headed duck and the red-headed pochard.  This waterfowl is easily distinguished from other ducks by the male's copper coloured head and bright blue bill during the breeding season.

Taxonomy and phylogeny

Taxonomy 
The redhead is in the family Anatidae (ducks, swans, geese) and genus Aythya (diving ducks).  There are currently no described subspecies of the redhead.

The two syntype specimens of Fuligula americana Eyton (Monogr. Anat., 1838, p.155) are held in the vertebrate zoology collections of National Museums Liverpool at World Museum, with accession numbers NML-VZ D829 (male immature) and NML-VZ D829a (female adult). The specimens were collected in North America and came to the Liverpool national collection via Thomas Campbell Eyton’s collection and the 13th Earl of Derby’s collection which was bequeathed to the city of Liverpool.

Phylogeny 
The redhead and the common pochard form a sister group which itself is sister to the canvasback. This group is then sister to the monophyletic group consisting of the white-eyes (hardhead, Madagascar pochard, and the sister species ferruginous duck and baer's pochard) and scaups (New Zealand scaup, ring-necked duck, tufted duck, greater scaup, lesser scaup).

Description 
The redhead is a pochard, a diving duck specially adapted to foraging underwater. Their legs are placed farther back on the body, which makes walking on land difficult, the webbing on their feet is larger than dabbling ducks and their bills are broader, to facilitate underwater foraging. In addition, pochards have a lobed hind toe. No pochard has a metallic coloured speculum, something that is characteristic of other ducks.

Males 

During breeding season, adult males have a copper head and neck, with a black breast. The back and sides are grey, the belly is white and the rump and tail are a light black. Male bills are pale blue with a black tip and a thin ring separating the two colours.  Non breeding males lose the copper colour and instead have brown heads.

Females 
Adult females, however, have a yellow to brown head and neck. The breast is brown, the belly is white and the rest of the body is a grey to brown. The female bills are slate with a dark tip that is separated by a blue ring. Females remain the same colour year round.

Distribution 
During breeding season, redheads are found across a wide range of North America, from as far north as Northern Canada to the Caribbean. Their preferred areas include the intermontane regions of British Columbia, Alberta, Saskatchewan, Manitoba, and the Dakotas with some small localities in Ontario, Quebec and southern United States. These pochards then migrate south to winter in warmer climates.  These areas include southern United States where breeding does not occur and extends to Mexico, Guatemala, Cuba, and the Bahamas.  In either season, redheads use wetlands as their main habitat.

Habitat 
Small, semi-permanent wetlands in non-forested country where the water is deep enough to provide dense emergent vegetation is considered ideal breeding habitat for redheads.  When wintering, redheads switch to large areas of water near the coast that are protected from wave action but can also be found in reservoirs, lakes, playa wetlands, freshwater river deltas, coastal marshes, estuaries and bays.

Predators 
Redheads do not have many predators and are most likely to die of disease or indirect human impact. These ducks are considered less desirable as table fare than their puddle duck cousins like the mallard; however, their beautiful plumage makes them a targeted species for waterfowl hunters looking to focus on diving ducks.  Adults can be preyed upon by northern river otters, red-tailed hawks, great horned owls, bald eagles, golden eagles and to a greater extent, minks.  Most predation comes in the form of duckling predation and egg foraging.  Northern pike and snapping turtles are known to eat ducklings whereas skunks, minks, crows and magpies will steal and eat redhead eggs.

Population status 
The North American Waterfowl Management Plan for redheads is 760,000 North American birds.  The population size has increased in the past few decades to well over 1.4 million birds.  Redheads make up 2% of North America's duck population and only 1% of its harvested ducks.  Populations may be stable because of restrictive bag limits for the species.  In addition, the species uses semi-permanent and permanent wetlands to breed and these habitats are less likely to be affected by drought.  For future management of the species, organizations are looking into wetland conservation.

Behaviour

Migration

Spring 
Redheads leave their winter range in late January and February with all birds migrating by mid-March. In western North America, migrants begin arriving in Oregon, British Columbia and Colorado in February. In central North America, migrants arrive as soon as temperatures open wetlands and lakes, which can range from late February (Nebraska) to early May (Alberta, Manitoba and Iowa). In the Great Lakes region and north-eastern North America, migrants will also arrive as soon as bodies of water open up.

Fall 
Western birds migrate through Great Basin to the Pacific Coast. In British Columbia, fall migration begins in September and continues through October. The Great Salt Lake region is of particular importance to migrants in western United States. Central North American redheads will begin migrating earlier, around August/September and go through the Great Plains to the Texas coast.  Eastern populations will migrate through the Great Lakes region to the Atlantic Coast or Florida from October to November. Most redheads winter along the Gulf of Mexico (offshore Louisiana, Florida and Mexico) however eastern populations will winter in South Carolina.

Reproduction

Mating 

Redheads flock together on lakes and other bodies of water but will migrate in pairs, which are formed in December or January through elaborate courtship rituals. Unpaired redheads will migrate together in a ‘courting party’ that can be up to 25 individuals strong and hopefully find a mate within the group. The pair bonds are established yearly through a long courtship process. Males begin this process through neck-kinking and head throwing displays while emitting a cat-like call. The male will continue by initiating a neck-stretching display while producing a cough like call, a display and vocalization in which the females reciprocates. If interested, the female will herself produce inciting calls towards the male while performing alternate lateral and chin lifting movements. The male then swims ahead of her and turns the back of his head towards the female.  Once courtship is finished, the two birds are paired for the year.  Eventually, the male initiates copulation by alternating bill dipping and preening dorsally towards the female, an action in which the female might return to the male.

Nesting 
Once copulation is completed, female redheads begin forming nests.  They are built with thick and strong plant material in emergent vegetation, such as hard stem bulrush, cattails and sedges, over or near standing water.  Redheads do not defend their territory or home range and are actually very social while in their breeding ground. This is thought to occur because some younger, inexperienced redhead females parasitize other pochards. Some redheads lay their eggs in other pochards’ nests, including the canvasback, ring-necked duck and greater and lesser scaups and this social parasitism by redheads reduces the hatching success of other pochards’ eggs, especially those of the canvasback. In contrast, because of the parasitic relationship between the redhead and other pochards, redhead hybrids with the ring-necked duck, canvasback and the greater and lesser scaups have been found.  Canvasback x redhead hybrids can be fertile.  Brood sizes range from 5-7 young, with the mother abandoning the chicks at 8 weeks old, before they are capable of flying.  They remain flightless for another 2–4 weeks.

Vocalizations 
There is little information on redhead vocalizations outside of breeding calls.  Males will emit calls when courting the female.  When the neck is fully extended in the neck-stretching display, males will emit a distinct wheee-oww, which sounds catlike.  Males may also produce a soft coughing call, although this call is less frequent.  Females will emit a soft errrr note when she is inciting a male.

Feeding habits 
All pochards have similar diets that include both plant and animal materials.  Redheads undergo a niche switch when breeding and when wintering.  During the breeding season, redheads will eat as much animal matter as possible, including gastropods, mollusks and insect larvae.  They will eat the occasional grass and other emergent vegetation.  However, once they fly south, redheads will change their diet to include mostly plant material, including pondweeds, wild rice, wild celery, wigeon grass, bulrushes, muskgrass and shoal grass.

Gastropods known as food of Aythya americana include: Acteocina canaliculata, Acteon punctostriatus, Anachis avara, Anachis obesa, Caecum nitidum, Calliostoma sp., Cerithidea pliculosa, Cerithium lutosum, Crepidula convexa, Diastoma varium, Melanella sp., Mitrella lunata, Nassarius acutus, Nassarius vibex, Natica sp., Neritina virginea, Odostomia trifida, Olivella minuta, Olivella watermani, Polinices sp., Pyramidellidae, Pyrgocythara plicosa, Rissoina catesbyana, Sayella livida, Turbonilla sp., Turbonilla interrupta and Vitrinella sp.

References

External links

Redhead Species Account - Cornell Lab of Ornithology
Redhead - Aythya americana - USGS Patuxent Bird Identification InfoCenter
 
Sound, Sound metadata Macaulay Library, Cornell Lab of Ornithology
 
 

Aythya
Birds of North America
Birds of Mexico
Birds of the Greater Antilles
Birds of the Bahamas
Birds of Canada
Birds of the Turks and Caicos Islands
Birds of Bermuda
Birds described in 1838
Taxa named by Thomas Campbell Eyton